The 1816 United States presidential election in Ohio took place between November 1 and December 4, 1816, as part of the 1816 United States presidential election. Voters chose 8 representatives, or electors to the Electoral College, who voted for President and Vice President.

Ohio elected Democratic-Republican candidate James Monroe over Federalist candidate Rufus King. Monroe won Ohio by a margin of 69.74%.

Results

See also
 United States presidential elections in Ohio

References

Ohio
1816
1816 Ohio elections